The Kerch Strait is a strait in Eastern Europe. It connects the Black Sea and the Sea of Azov, separating the Kerch Peninsula of Crimea in the west from the Taman Peninsula of Russia's Krasnodar Krai in the east. The most important harbor, the Crimean city of Kerch, gives its name to the strait, formerly known as the Cimmerian Bosporus. It has also been called the Straits of Yenikale after the Yeni-Kale fortress in Kerch. 

Taman, the most important settlement on the Taman Peninsula side of the strait, sits on Taman Bay, which is separated from the main Kerch Strait by the Chushka Spit to the north and the former Tuzla Spit to the south; the Tuzla Spit is now Tuzla Island, connected to the Taman Peninsula by a 2003 Russian-built  dam, and to mainland Crimea by the Crimean Bridge opened in 2018.  A major cargo port is under construction near Taman.

History

Greek and Roman records 

In antiquity, there seem to have been a group of islands intersected by arms of the Kuban River (Hypanis) and various sounds which have since silted up. The Romans knew the strait as the Cimmerian Bosporus from its Greek name, the Cimmerian Strait (Kimmérios Bosporos), which honored the Cimmerians, nearby steppe nomads. In ancient times the low-lying land near the Strait was known as the Maeotic Swamp.

Second World War 
During the Second World War, the Kerch Peninsula became the scene of much desperate combat between forces of the Soviet Red Army and Nazi Germany. Fighting frequency intensified in the coldest months of year when the strait froze over, allowing the movement of troops over the ice.

After the Eastern Front stabilized in early 1943, Hitler ordered the construction of a  road-and-rail bridge across the Strait of Kerch in the spring of 1943 to support his desire for a renewed offensive to the Caucasus. The cable railway (aerial tramway), which went into operation on 14 June 1943 with a daily capacity of one thousand tons, was only adequate for the defensive needs of the Seventeenth Army in the Kuban bridgehead. Because of frequent earth tremors, this bridge would have required vast quantities of extra-strength steel girders, and their transport would have curtailed shipments of military material to the Crimea. The bridge was never completed, and the Wehrmacht finished evacuating the Kuban bridgehead in September 1943.

In 1944 the Soviets built a "provisional" railway bridge (Kerch railway bridge) across the strait. Construction made use of supplies captured from the Germans. The bridge went into operation in November 1944, but moving ice floes destroyed it in February 1945; reconstruction was not attempted.

Post-war ferry service 

After the war, ferry transportation across the strait was established in 1954, connecting Crimea and the Krasnodar Krai (Port Krym – Port Kavkaz line). Originally there were four train ferry ships; later three car-ferry ships were added. Train transportation continued for almost 40 years. The aging train-ferries became obsolete in the late 1980s and were removed from service. In the autumn of 2004, new ships were delivered as replacements and train transportation was re-established. The ferry line stopped operations in late 2020.

Dispute and naval treaty of 2003  
A territorial dispute between Russia and Ukraine in 2003 centred on Tuzla Island in the Strait of Kerch. Ukraine and Russia agreed to treat the strait and the Azov Sea as shared internal waters.

Storm of November 2007 

On Sunday 11 November 2007 news agencies reported a very strong storm on the Black Sea. Four ships sank, six ran aground on a sandbank, and two tankers were damaged, resulting in a major oil spill and the death of 23 sailors.

The Russian-flagged oil tanker Volgoneft-139 encountered trouble in the Kerch Strait where it sought shelter from the above storm. During the storm the tanker split in half, releasing more than 2000 tonnes of fuel oil. Four other boats sank in the storm, resulting in the release of sulphur cargo. The storm hampered efforts to rescue crew members.
Another victim of the storm, the Russian cargo ship Volnogorsk, loaded with sulfur, sank at Port Kavkaz on the same day.

Russo-Ukrainian War since 2014 

Russia and Ukraine agreed to guarantee each other freedom of navigation for ships of both nations in a 2003 naval treaty.
Since the start of the Russo-Ukrainian War and the annexation of Crimea in 2014, however, Russian forces have forcibly established a new status quo, now being the straits' sole controlling power.

New Bridge and naval blockade 

Moscow mayor Yuri Luzhkov campaigned for a highway bridge to be constructed across the strait. Since 1944, various bridge projects to span the strait have been proposed or attempted, always hampered by the difficult geologic and geographic configuration of the area. Construction of an approach was actually started in 2003 with the -long dam, provoking the 2003 Tuzla Island conflict.

After the 2014 Russian annexation of Crimea the government of Russia decided to build a bridge across the Kerch Strait. The 19-kilometre Crimean Bridge opened to road traffic in 2018 and the rail section opened in 2019.

Russian state-backed media claims that construction of the bridge caused increases in nutrients and planktons in the waters, attracting large numbers of fish and more than 1,000 endangered Black Sea bottlenose dolphins. However, Ukraine claims that the acoustic noise and pollution from both the bridge construction and military exercises may actually be killing Black Sea dolphins.

Kerch Strait incident (2018) 

When two Ukrainian navy vessels tried to pass under the bridge to reach Mariupol in November 2018, Russian forces responded by blocking the straits with a large container ship. Upon turning back, the Ukrainian ships and crews were fired upon and seized by the Russian coast guard.

2019 Gas tanker disaster 

Two gas carriers collided and exploded in 2019, killing 14 people.

2021 closure by Russia 
On 15 April 2021 Russia decided to close the area of Kerch Strait to "warships and other state vessels" from 24 April to 31 October. The stated rationale for the closure are military exercises. The closure partially cut off the Ukrainian ports of Berdyansk and Mariupol from the Black Sea. The Ukrainian Foreign Ministry protested against the decision, stating that "such actions by the Russian Federation are another attempt to violate the norms and principles of international law to usurp the sovereign rights of Ukraine as a coastal state, as Ukraine has the right to regulate navigation in these areas of the Black Sea". According to the  Ukrainian Foreign Ministry, the decision is a violation of the freedom of navigation under the UN Convention on the Law of the Sea.

The decision to close the strait was preceded by Russia's warning the United States after the Biden administration's plan to send two destroyers (USS Roosevelt and USS Donald Cook) to the Black Sea amid Russia's increasing military presence near Ukraine. The Biden administration withheld the destroyers after fighting intensified between Ukrainian and Russian-backed separatist forces in an effort to alleviate the tension. Putin had threatened the safety of the US Navy ships, saying that they should stay away from the area “for their own good”. After the destroyers were withheld, Russia took advantage of the opening to close the Kerch Strait.

2021 Donbass ship 
On 9 December 2021 Ukrainian command ship Donbas departed from Mariupol and approached Kerch Strait. It didn't give a notice in advance to pass the strait and was warned by Russian coast guard such a notice should be given for the safety of maritime traffic. At the moment around 80 civilian ships were waiting to pass the strait.

2022 Crimean Bridge Explosion 

In the morning of 8 October 2022 at 06:07 (Moscow time), an explosion occurred on the road portion of the Crimean Bridge, causing major damage. Seven fuel cars of a passing railway train also ignited, causing an extensive fire on the parallel rail bridge, and two half-sections of the road bridge collapsed.

Kerch–Yenikale Canal 

In order to improve navigational capabilities of the Strait of Kerch, which is quite shallow in its narrowest point, the Kerch–Yenikale Canal was dredged through the strait. The main channel can accommodate vessels up to 215 meters long with a draft of up to 8 meters with a compulsory pilot assistance. The canal is not straight, and its geometry further complicates safe navigation. The narrowness, limited depth, and turns of the main channel together with the often unpredictable effects of wind and visibility (fog) mean that there are strict procedures regulating strait transit. Transit of large vessels occurs on a one-way (alternating) group convoy basis. Transit procedures have remained unchanged, whether under Soviet, Ukrainian, or Russian jurisdiction. The Vessel Traffic Control Post in Kerch controls and oversees all traffic.

Fishing
Several fish-processing plants are located on the Crimean coast of the strait. The fishing season begins in late autumn and lasts for 2 to 3 months, when many seiners put out into the strait to fish. The Taman Bay is a major fishing ground, with many fishing villages scattered along the coast.

Notes

References

External links
 

 
Straits of Crimea
Bodies of water of the Black Sea
Kerch Peninsula
Straits of Russia
Strait
International straits
Russia–Ukraine border
Geography of Krasnodar Krai